Adrias was a Type III  destroyer that was originally built for the Royal Navy as HMS Border but never commissioned. Before her completion, she was loaned to the Royal Hellenic Navy on 20 July 1942 and commissioned as Adrias on 5 August 1942 in order to relieve heavy losses of ships sustained by the Royal Hellenic Navy during the German invasion of 1941 and throughout the war. Adrias took her name from the ancient Greek town of Adria in Italy, at the mouth of the Po river, after which the Adriatic Sea is named (Herodotus vi. 127, vii. 20, ix. 92; Euripides, Hippolytus, 736).

Command of Adrias was accepted by Cmdr. Ioannis Toumbas in Newcastle, England, on 20 July 1942. Upon completion of the training period on 26 August, while sailing under foggy conditions with only the left engine functioning, she ran aground near Scapa Flow. The damage took four months to repair. No responsibility was attributed to the captain for the accident. In the beginning of January, 1943, after the completion of repairs, Adrias sailed to the Mediterranean where she participated in missions escorting convoys.

Service
When the war ended the loss of the German submarine was officially confirmed to have occurred on 27 January. However, the name of the ship that caused the sinking was not mentioned. During that same operation on 13 February 1943, Adrias sunk or seriously damaged  (the last report from that submarine was dated 9 February 1943).

Adrias took part in numerous convoy escorts in the Mediterranean as well as in the Sicily landing operations, where on the night of 20 July 1943, in cooperation with British escort destroyer  she successfully confronted 3 German torpedo boats during a night engagement and sunk two of them. On 20 September 1943 Adrias represented Greece when a force of four Allied ships accepted the surrender of a contingent of the Italian Royal Navy (out of Taranto) that was sailing towards Malta following the armistice with Italy.

On 22 October 1943, during operations in the Dodecanese, while near the island of Kalymnos with the British destroyer , Adrias struck a mine. The explosion tore her bow off. The English Flotilla Commander onboard Hurworth ordered Cmdr. Toumbas to abandon ship. Hurworth, while trying to come to Adriass rescue, also hit a mine and sunk taking 133 men with her. In spite of the damage suffered, Adrias took on the survivors of Hurworth (among them her CO) and managed to reach the nearby coast of Gümüşlük in neutral Turkey with 21 men of her crew dead and 30 wounded. After some minor repairs, the ship sailed on 1 December for Alexandria, despite her missing bow. This achievement was considered a brilliant example of seamanship, and provided a morale boost to the Royal Hellenic Navy and other allied ships in the Mediterranean.

After the liberation of Greece from the Germans, Adrias, with her bow temporarily repaired, arrived in Faliro with the rest of the ships of the Hellenic Fleet. The ship was never fully repaired due to the termination of war operations in the Mediterranean and sailed to England where she was returned to the Royal Navy.

The Hellenic Navy gave the same name to commemorate this ship to Standard type frigate Adrias (F-459) in 1994.

References

Publications

External links 
Relevant Hellenic Navy page
Relevant UBoat net page
 

Hunt-class destroyers of the Royal Navy
Ships built by Swan Hunter
1942 ships
World War II destroyers of the United Kingdom
Hunt-class destroyers of the Hellenic Navy
World War II destroyers of Greece
Maritime incidents in October 1943